Helmut Klöpsch (4 December 1939 – 13 September 2019) was a German biathlete. He competed in the 20 km individual event at the 1964 Winter Olympics.

References

1939 births
2019 deaths
German male biathletes
Olympic biathletes of the United Team of Germany
Biathletes at the 1964 Winter Olympics
Sportspeople from Gliwice